In Greek mythology, Automedon (Ancient Greek: Αὐτομέδων), son of Diores, was Achilles' charioteer, who drove the immortal horses Balius and Xanthos.<ref>The New Century Classical Handbook; Catherine Avery, editor; Appleton-Century-Crofts, New York, 1962, p. 205:"Automedon...In Homeric legend (Iliad), a son of Diores. He was Achilles' charioteer, the driver of the immortal horses Balius and Xanthus."
</ref>

 Mythology 
In Homer's Iliad, Automedon rides into battle once Patroclus dons Achilles's armor, commanding Achilles' horses Balius and Xanthos.  After Patroclus dies, Automedon is driven to the rear of the battle, where he tries to console the bereaved horses.

Zeus finally intervenes, and Automedon resumes driving the chariot, but cannot aid the Achaeans until Alcimedon agrees to be his driver. He repels an attempt on his life by Hector, Aeneas, Chromios, and Aretos, killing Aretos and taking his armor in the process. He also appears in the Aeneid at line 477 of Book II, when the Greek forces break into the palace of Priam.

 Notes 

References
Homer. Iliad, XVI, 145; XVII, 429; XIX; XXIII; XIV.
Homer, The Iliad with an English Translation by A.T. Murray, Ph.D. in two volumes. Cambridge, MA., Harvard University Press; London, William Heinemann, Ltd. 1924. . Online version at the Perseus Digital Library.
Homer, Homeri Opera'' in five volumes. Oxford, Oxford University Press. 1920. . Greek text available at the Perseus Digital Library.

External links
 

Achaean Leaders
Characters in the Aeneid

Characters in Greek mythology